Eduardo Miguel Solari (born 18 September 1955) is an Argentine former professional footballer who played as a midfielder and later manager.

Capped once for Argentina, he spent most of his career in Rosario Central before moving abroad to Atlético Junior. After his stay there he played five years for four different clubs.

He started his managerial career in Atlético Junior. He then coached in Argentina, and was assistant manager to his brother Jorge Solari for Saudi Arabia in 1994. From 1995 to 2001 he mostly coached in Mexico, for Atlas, Atlético Celaya, Atlético Morelia, Monterrey and lastly Atlas again, but also had a stint as Vélez Sarsfield manager in 1998.

References

1950 births
Living people
Argentine footballers
Rosario Central footballers
Atlético Junior footballers
Club de Gimnasia y Esgrima La Plata footballers
Argentinos Juniors footballers
Atlético Tucumán footballers
Argentina international footballers
Argentine football managers
Atlético Junior managers
Club de Gimnasia y Esgrima La Plata managers
Estudiantes de La Plata managers
Rosario Central managers
Racing Club de Avellaneda managers
Atlas F.C. managers
Atlético Morelia managers
Club Atlético Vélez Sarsfield managers
C.F. Monterrey managers
Argentine expatriate football managers
Expatriate football managers in Colombia
Argentine expatriate sportspeople in Colombia
Expatriate football managers in Mexico
Argentine expatriate sportspeople in Mexico